Frame by Frame may refer to:

Film and video
 Frame by Frame (film), a 2015 documentary about photographers in Afghanistan
 Frame by Frame, a 1996 film starring Brenda Bakke
 Frame by Frame, a video series and blog on film history and related topics by Wheeler Winston Dixon

Music

Albums
 Frame by Frame (album), a 2013 album by country artist Cassadee Pope
 Frame by Frame: The Essential King Crimson,  a 1991 4-CD compilation by King Crimson

Songs
 "Frame by Frame", a song by King Crimson from the album Discipline

See also 
 Animation
 Film frame
 Stop motion
 Frame (disambiguation)